Arley Green is a hamlet in Cheshire, England, within the parish of Aston By Budworth. The buildings originally formed Cowhouse Farm.  Rowland Egerton-Warburton, the then owner of nearby Arley Hall, converted the half-timbered barn into a school in the 1830s and adapted another 18th-century building into a terrace of Tudor-style buildings.  The farmhouse was converted into a parsonage. All three buildings are Grade II listed.

References

External links

Villages in Cheshire